Pasta Zara–Cogeas is a former professional cycling team based in Lithuania, which was competing in elite road bicycle racing events such as the UCI Women's Road World Cup.

Major wins

1998
 Time Trial Championship, Zoulfia Zabirova
Trophée International de Saint-Amand-Mont-Rond, Alessandra Cappellotto
 Overall Grande Boucle Féminine Internationale, Edita Pučinskaitė
 Time Trial Championship, Edita Pučinskaitė
Embrach, Zoulfia Zabirova
1999
Primavera Rosa, Sara Felloni
Berner Rundfahrt, Marion Brauen
UCI Track Cycling World Cup – Cali (Individual pursuit), Marion Clignet
UCI Track Cycling World Cup – Cali (Points race), Marion Clignet
 Overall Grande Boucle Féminine Internationale, Diana Žiliūtė
World Road Race Championship, Edita Pučinskaitė
2000
Primavera Rosa, Diana Žiliūtė
Route Féminine Du Vignoble Nantais, Marion Clignet
Le Critérium International Féminin De Lachine, Diana Žiliūtė
 Time Trial Championship, Zoulfia Zabirova
GP Ouest France, Diana Žiliūtė
2001
Berner Rundfahrt, Vera Hohlfeld
Nieuw–Lekkerland, Arenda Grimberg
 Time Trial Championship, Priska Doppmann
Stages 3 & 5 Tour de Bretagne, Arenda Grimberg
Westerbeek, Mirjam Melchers-van Poppel
World Road Race Championship, Rasa Polikevičiūtė
2002
 Overall Vuelta Castilla y Leon, Nicole Brändli
 Road Race Championship, Zita Urbonaitė
 Road Race Championship, Nicole Brändli
Stage 9 Grande Boucle Féminine Internationale, Nicole Brändli
2003
Stage 3 Damesronde van Drenthe, Ghita Beltman
Trofeo Alfredo Binda – Comune di Cittiglio, Diana Žiliūtė
Stage 3 Tour du Grand Montréal, Diana Žiliūtė
 Road Race Championship, Diana Žiliūtė
Steenwijk, Chantal Beltman
Gouden Pijl, Chantal Beltman
 Rund um die Nürnberger Altstadt, Diana Žiliūtė
Stages 1, 2 & 7 Holland Ladies Tour, Diana Žiliūtė
Rotterdam Tour, Chantal Beltman
2004 
Stage 1 Vuelta a Castilla y León, Regina Schleicher
Stage 1 Novilon Eurocup Ronde van Drenthe, Giorgia Bronzini
Stage 3 Giro del Trentino Alto Adige-Südtirol, Regina Schleicher
 Time Trial Championship, Diana Žiliūtė
 Road Race Championship, Diana Žiliūtė
 Road Championship, Nicole Cooke
 Overall Giro d'Italia Femminile, Nicole Cooke
Prologue & Stage 6, Diana Žiliūtė
Stage 3, Regina Schleicher
Stage 8, Nicole Cooke
Stage 2 International Thüringen Rundfahrt der Frauen, Modesta Vžesniauskaitė
Stage 3 Boels Ladies Tour, Regina Schleicher
Stage 6 Boels Ladies Tour, Giorgia Bronzini
Stage 1a Giro della Toscana, Nicole Cooke
2005
Trofeo Alfredo Binda, Nicole Cooke
GP Costa Etrusca, Nicole Cooke
Grand Prix de Dottignies, Nicole Cooke
Geelong – Women's World Cup, Rochelle Gilmore
Giro Frazioni, Nicole Cooke
GP de Wallonie, Nicole Cooke
La Flèche Wallonne, Nicole Cooke
 Road Championship, Nicole Cooke
 Time Trial Championship, Miyoko Karami
Stage 5 Boels Ladies Tour, Nicole Cooke
Stahe 1a Giro della Toscana Femminile, Nicole Cooke
2006
Stage 2 Geelong Tour, Rochelle Gilmore
GP Liberazione, Diana Žiliūtė
Prologue & Stage 1 Giro di San Marino, Diana Žiliūtė
 Road Race Championship, Diana Žiliūtė
Stage 3 International Thüringen Rundfahrt der Frauen, Veronica Andrèasson
Prologue & Stages 1, 5, 6 & 7 Route de France Féminine, Diana Žiliūtė
2007
Grand Prix de Dottignies, Giorgia Bronzini
Novilon Eurocup Ronde van Drenthe, Giorgia Bronzini
GP Liberazione, Giorgia Bronzini
Overall Tour de Prince Edward Island, Diana Žiliūtė
Stage 2, Diana Žiliūtė
Stages 3 & 5, Giorgia Bronzini
 Time Trial Championship, Vera Carrara
Stage 1 Giro d'Italia Femminile, Giorgia Bronzini
Stages 3 & 6 Trophée d'Or Féminin, Giorgia Bronzini
Stage 1 Tour Cycliste Féminin International Ardèche, Diana Žiliūtė
Stage 4a Giro della Toscana Femminile, Giorgia Bronzini
Stage 4b Giro della Toscana Femminile, Diana Žiliūtė
World Road Championship, Marta Bastianelli
2008
Stages 1, 3 & 4 Grande Boucle féminine, Diana Žiliūtė
GP Carnevale d'Europa, Diana Žiliūtė
Stage 6 Trophée d'Or Féminin, Eneritz Iturriagaechevarria
Stages 3 & 5 Tour Cycliste Féminin International Ardèche, Diana Žiliūtė
2009 
Stages 1 & 3 Ladies Tour of Qatar, Giorgia Bronzini
GP Liberazione, Giorgia Bronzini
Stages 1, 3 & 4 Tour de Prince Edward Island, Giorgia Bronzini
 Time Trial Championship, Diana Žiliūtė
 Road Race Championship, Rasa Leleivytė
GP Carnevale d'Europa, Giorgia Bronzini
Prologue Route de France Féminine, Diana Žiliūtė
 Overall Trophée d'Or Féminin, Diana Žiliūtė
Prologue & Stages 2, 3 & 6, Diana Žiliūtė
 Overall Giro della Toscana Femminile, Diana Žiliūtė
Stage 2, Giorgia Bronzini
2010 
Stage 1 Ladies Tour of Qatar, Rasa Leleivytė
GP Comune di Cornaredo, Rasa Leleivytė
Stage 3 Giro del Trentino Alto Adige-Südtirol, Eleonora Patuzzo
 Road Championship, Aušrinė Trebaitė
 Overall International Thüringen Rundfahrt der Frauen, Olga Zabelinskaya
Stage 1 Trophée d'Or Féminin, Alyona Andruk
Stage 2a Trophée d'Or Féminin, Inga Čilvinaitė
Stage 3 Trophée d'Or Féminin, Rasa Leleivytė
2011 
Stage 4 Women's Tour of New Zealand, Alyona Andruk
GP Costa Etrusca III, Shelley Olds
2012
 Road Championship, Giada Borgato
Stage 1 Tour de Free State, Alyona Andruk
 Road Championship, Inga Čilvinaitė
Stage 4, 5, & 6 Trophée d'Or Féminin, Giorgia Bronzini
Stage 1 & 4 Giro della Toscana Femminile, Giorgia Bronzini
Stage 3 Giro della Toscana Femminile, Inga Čilvinaitė
2013
 Overall Vuelta Ciclista Femenina a Costa Rica, Inga Čilvinaitė
Stage 1, Evelyn García
Stages 2 & 4, Inga Čilvinaitė
Stage 3, Edita Janeliūnaitė
Stage 5, Addyson Albershardt
Stage 5, Vuelta El Salvador, Addyson Albershardt
Panamerican Championships (ITT), Íngrid Drexel
 National Time Trial Championships, Íngrid Drexel

National champions

2004
 Lithuanian Time Trial Championship, Diana Žiliūtė
 Lithuanian Road Championship, Diana Žiliūtė
 British Road Championship, Nicole Cooke
2005
 British Road Championship, Nicole Cooke
 Japanese Time Trial Championship, Miyoko Karami
2006
 Lithuanian Road Championship, Diana Žiliūtė
2007
 Italian Time Trial Championship, Vera Carrara
 World Road Championship, Marta Bastianelli
2009
 Lithuanian Time Trial Championship, Diana Žiliūtė
 Lithuanian Road Championship, Rasa Leleivytė
2010
 Lithuanian Road Championship, Aušrinė Trebaitė
2012
 Italian Road Championship, Giada Borgato
 Lithuanian Road Championship, Inga Čilvinaitė
2013
 Time Trial Championships, Íngrid Drexel

Team rosters

2013

2012
Ages as of 1 January 2012.

2011
Ages as of 1 January 2011.

References

UCI Women's Teams
Cycling teams based in Lithuania
Defunct cycling teams
Cycling teams established in 1996
Cycling teams disestablished in 2013
Defunct cycling teams based in Italy